The raised-cosine filter is a filter frequently used for pulse-shaping in digital modulation due to its ability to minimise intersymbol interference (ISI).

Mathematical description

The raised-cosine filter is an implementation of a low-pass Nyquist filter, i.e., one that has the property of vestigial symmetry.

Its frequency-domain description is a piecewise-defined function, given by:

or in terms of havercosines:

for

	

The impulse response of such a filter is given by:

in terms of the normalised sinc function.  Here, this is the "communications sinc"  rather than the mathematical one.

Roll-off factor
Some authors use .

where  is the symbol-rate.

As can be seen, the time-domain ripple level increases as  decreases. This shows that the excess bandwidth of the filter can be reduced, but only at the expense of an elongated impulse response.

β = 0
As  approaches 0, the roll-off zone becomes infinitesimally narrow, hence:

where  is the rectangular function, so the impulse response approaches . Hence, it converges to an ideal or brick-wall filter in this case.

β = 1
When , the non-zero portion of the spectrum is a pure raised cosine, leading to the simplification:

or

Bandwidth
The bandwidth of a raised cosine filter is most commonly defined as the width of the non-zero frequency-positive portion of its spectrum, i.e.:

As measured using a spectrum analyzer, the radio bandwidth B in Hz of the modulated signal is twice the baseband bandwidth BW (as explained in [1]), i.e.:

Auto-correlation function

The auto-correlation function of raised cosine function is as follows:

 

The auto-correlation result can be used to analyze various sampling offset results when analyzed with auto-correlation.

Application

When used to filter a symbol stream, a Nyquist filter has the property of eliminating ISI, as its impulse response is zero at all  (where  is an integer), except .

Therefore, if the transmitted waveform is correctly sampled at the receiver, the original symbol values can be recovered completely.

However, in many practical communications systems, a matched filter is used in the receiver, due to the effects of white noise.  For zero ISI, it is the net response of the transmit and receive filters that must equal :

And therefore:

These filters are called root-raised-cosine filters.

Raised cosine is a commonly used apodization filter for fiber Bragg gratings.

References

 Glover, I.; Grant, P. (2004). Digital Communications (2nd ed.). Pearson Education Ltd. .
 Proakis, J. (1995). Digital Communications (3rd ed.). McGraw-Hill Inc. .
 Tavares, L.M.; Tavares G.N. (1998) Comments on "Performance of Asynchronous Band-Limited DS/SSMA Systems" . IEICE Trans. Commun., Vol. E81-B, No. 9

External links
Technical article entitled "The care and feeding of digital, pulse-shaping filters" originally published in RF Design, written by Ken Gentile.

Linear filters
Telecommunication theory